Tarur may refer to

Tarur-I, a village in Palakkad district, Kerala, India
Tarur-II, a village in Palakkad district, Kerala, India
Tarur (gram panchayat), a gram panchayat serving the above two villages